Tapan Baruah (Assamese: তপন বৰুৱা) (real name Madan Das) was the first Commander of 28th Battalion of ULFA. Killed on 20 May 2002, Tapan Baruah was widely known as a skilled hardcore militant in guerrilla warfare in the outlawed United Liberation Front of Asom.

According to conflict analysists Tapan Baruah was trained in Kachin of Myanmar.

Tapan Baruah was also ULFA's Action Group Commander.

Biography
Born on 16 February 1972, Madan Das joined the ULFA in 1988 while studying at Nalbari College. He studied at the Debiram Pathsala High School in Nalbari district, and was 1986 HSLC pass out of the school. Tapan Baruah attended Nalbari College for his pre-university course but didn't attend the exam an joined the ULFA. After joining ULFA, he became a close aide of the outfit's Commander-in-Chief Paresh Baruah. Tapan Baruah and was very soon promoted as one of the dreaded commanders. In 1998, he was assigned the task of the commander of the 28th Battalion of the outfit. With his politeness Tapan was popular in his locality before he joined the outfit.

Major Assassination 
Tapan Baruah and Drishti Rajkhowa are believed in involvement in the bombing & killing of Assam Minister Nagen Sharma in 2000.

In 2001, the then Assam's Director-general of police Harekrishna Deka, said in an interview that the killings in upper Assam had a clear command of Tapan Baruah, while the killings in lower Assam were commanded by Raju Baruah.

Death
On 20 May 2002, Tapan Baruah was surrounded in Talpothar Majhgaon of Kakopathar by hundreds of Indian Army personnel following an intelligence input. At that time, approx morning 11 AM, he was on his morning meal in the house of Rebati Dhadumia, while he was surrounded without his knowing. While army personnel's position was known to him, he tried to flee away but it was too late. He tried to flee out running more than 1  km, but was wounded with bullets shots fired by dozens of Army. Within half an hour, he collapsed and was declared dead. Some sources alleged that Tapan Baruah was shot in cold blood.

According to Assam police, the death of Tapan Baruah was a massive success for the security forces.

Soon after the killing of Tapan Baruah, several Assamese newspapers published news and reports glorifying Tapan Baruah. Some newspaper added citation of the ULFA's Operation Commander Raju Baruah and Foreign Secretary Shashadhar Choudhury's statement as follows:

See also
List of top leaders of ULFA
Raju Baruah
28th Battalion (ULFA)
Drishti Rajkhowa

References

ULFA members
2002 deaths
Assamese nationalism
Insurgency in Northeast India
People from Assam
1972 births
People from Nalbari
Nalbari district